Jack Reno (November 30, 1935 – November 1, 2008) was an American country singer.

Career
Born in Bloomfield, Iowa, United States, Reno appeared at the Grand Ole Opry in the 1960s, and played with Waylon Jennings and Dolly Parton. He recorded seven albums and scored 12 hits on the American country music charts, including "Hitchin' a Ride", "Repeat After Me" and "I Want One".

In addition, he was a long-time country music DJ, with stints in Cincinnati, Ohio and Omaha, Nebraska. He was named the Country Music Association's Disc Jockey of the Year in 1978.

Death
Reno died of brain cancer on November 1, 2008 in Florence, Kentucky.

Discography

Albums

Singles

References

External links
Biography @ Hillbilly-Music.com

1935 births
2008 deaths
American country singer-songwriters
Deaths from brain cancer in the United States
United Artists Records artists
People from Bloomfield, Iowa
20th-century American singers
Singer-songwriters from Iowa